Brons is a Dutch surname. It is probably patronymic ("son of Brun"). Brons may refer to:

 Andrew Brons (born 1947), British politician and former MEP
 Johannes Brons (1884–1964), Surinamese politician

References

Surnames of Dutch origin
Dutch-language surnames